The National Agency of Ukraine on Civil Service (NAUCS) - central authority of executive power, which ensures the formation and implementation of state policy in the field of civil service, provides functional management of public service in public authorities. Among the activities of the National Agency of Ukraine on Civil Service is the studying of the European experience in the field of civil service and the development of a proposal for the implementation of best international practices into the activities of the public authorities.

Main functions 
 Policy formulation and implementation
 Functional administration 
 Methodological guidance of the HR units 
 Control for implementation of legislation on civil service
 Adherence of unified requirements to candidates for civil service
 Training and professional development

Mission of the NAUCS 
 DEVELOPMENT of a professional, efficient, sustainable, politically impartial civil service that meets the principles of good governance,the standards and best practices of the EU Member States, the Organisation for Economic Co-operation and Development (OECD) countries
 ENSURING high-quality and effective functional management of the civil service in public authorities

Key priorities of the civil service development 
 Formation of the institutional capacity for the professional re-training of civil servants and the development of the top civil service
 Development of the integrated infrastructure of information system regarding the civil service HRMIS 
 Introduction of the modern approaches to the HR management in the system of civil service
 Drafting legislation on civil service issues and preparation of its implementation 
 Enhancement of the institutional capacity of the central executive agencies, needed for the adaptation of the national legislation to the EU standards
 Enhancement of the international cooperation in the area of civil service and public administration
 Improvement of the system and structure of the central executive agencies

See also
Center for Adaptation of Civil Service to the Standards of the European Union
Higher School of Public Administration
Richelieu forum
Civil service
Public administration

External links

Civil Service of Ukraine
National civil service commissions
1994 establishments in Ukraine
Organizations established in 1994